Teburoro Tito (modern spelling Tiito, pronounced Seetoh) (born 25 August 1953) is an I-Kiribati politician who served as the President and foreign minister of Kiribati from 1 October 1994 to 28 March 2003. He was elected for the first time in 1994. He was reelected in 1998 with 52% of the vote. His main opponent was Harry Tong. Tito was reelected again in February 2003 with 50.4% of the vote. His main opponent was then Taberannang Timeon. Tito, however, was deposed by the Parliament in a no confidence vote just one month after his reelection. One of the main reasons for his ejection was his decision to lease an ATR-72-500 aircraft at the government's expense; this lease cost A$8million during the first six months.

President Tito, through his speeches at the UN, interviews with international news media and his active participation at International Climate  conferences,  began the process of highlighting the detrimental effects of global warming on his and other South Pacific island nations.

He also brought his country into the limelight during the 2000 Millennium festivities, by causing it to be the first country to "see tomorrow," after moving the international date line in 1995.

He was appointed by President Taneti Maamau as Ambassador to the United States (24 January 2018) and Kiribati Permanent Representative to the United Nations (13 September 2017).

References

1953 births
Living people
Presidents of Kiribati
Foreign ministers of Kiribati
Ambassadors of Kiribati to the United States
Permanent Representatives of Kiribati to the United Nations
People from the Gilbert Islands
Protect the Maneaba politicians
20th-century I-Kiribati politicians
21st-century I-Kiribati politicians
Recipients of the Order of Tahiti Nui